The 8th AARP Movies for Grownups Awards, presented by AARP the Magazine, honored films released in 2008 made by people over the age of 50 and were announced on January 27, 2009. Pierce Brosnan won the award for Breakthrough Achievement for his performance in Mamma Mia!. Unlike most years, the ceremony did not feature an award for Career Achievement.

Awards

Winners and Nominees

Winners are listed first, highlighted in boldface, and indicated with a double dagger.

Breakthrough Accomplishment
 Pierce Brosnan: "We just love the way he attacks the challenge of pop singing with such reckless abandon. Simon Cowell would be aghast, but we're charmed."

Films with multiple nominations and wins

References

AARP Movies for Grownups Awards
AARP